The EBRD Literature Prize is a literary prize established in 2017 by the European Bank of Reconstruction and Development. As per the bank, the prize celebrates the "literary richness" of its operational regions, which spans some 40 countries across Europe, Asia and Africa. The prize is worth €20,000; it is shared by the writer and the translator. Funding for the prize is provided by the member nations of the EBRD, in cooperation with the British Council.

The inaugural winner was the Turkish writer Burhan Sönmez who won for his book Istanbul Istanbul.

Winners and nominees
 = winner

References

International literary awards
Awards established in 2017